Madzhalis (Dargwa: Мажалис) is a rural locality (a selo) and the administrative center of Kaytagsky District of the Republic of Dagestan, Russia. Population:  During the Russian Empire, the settlement was the administrative capital of the Kaytago-Tabasaransky Okrug.

Located on the Boghan river, Madzhalis (also spelled Majālis) was historically one of the capitals of the Qaytaq people. It was founded by the utsmi Sultan-Ahmad (who died in 1588); previously, it had been a place where people had gathered for tribal meetings. It was later succeeded as Qaytaq capital by Bashli sometime in the 18th century.

References

Sources 

Rural localities in Kaytagsky District